Vosek is a settlement in the Municipality of Pesnica in northeastern Slovenia. It lies on the left bank of the Pesnica River. The area is part of the traditional region of Styria. The municipality is now included in the Drava Statistical Region. Jarenina Creek empties into Lake Pernica in the northeastern part of the settlement.

A small chapel in the settlement dates to 1889.

References

External links
Vosek on Geopedia

Populated places in the Municipality of Pesnica